Sarakhs Airport  is an airport in Sarakhs, Razavi Khorasan Province, Iran.

References

Airports in Iran
Sarakhs County
Razavi Khorasan Province
Buildings and structures in Razavi Khorasan Province
Transportation in Razavi Khorasan Province